The Women's Professional Snooker Championship was a snooker tournament run from 1934 to 1950 by the Women's Billiards Association. The event was the world championship for female players during this time. Ruth Harrison was the most successful player, winning eight of the ten events. The event was later replaced by the World Women's Snooker Championship.

History
The tournament was held ten times from 1934 to 1950, with a break from 1941 to 1947. Only four different players reached the final during its existence, with Ruth Harrison winning eight of the ten events. The first tournaments were held at Burroughes Hall, London, and the tournaments after the break were held at Leicester Square Hall, London.

The last time that the tournament was held, in 1950, Thelma Carpenter won, a few days after winning the World Women's Billiards Championship title. This proved to be the last time the tournament was held, as public interest in the contest declined.

Although the competition was billed as a World Championship, no players from outside the United Kingdom participated.

Agnes Morris, the 1949 champion (and three-times runner-up), later competed in the World Women's Snooker Championship under her married name of Agnes Davies, and reached the final in 1980.

Finals

Finals – Statistics by player

Championship Details

1934 Championship
Source: Gloucestershire Echo, Coventry Evening Telegraph Birmingham Daily Gazette, Sheffield Independent.

There were five entrants.

First round
Ruth Harrison 3–0 Irene Armes (62–37, 52–37, 63–26)
Joyce Gardner, Rose Bradley, and Eva Collins received byes.

Semi-finals
Joyce Gardner 9–0 Rose Bradley
Ruth Harrison 7–2 Eva Collins (61–15, 68–20, 48–12, 66–12, 77–10, 34–48, 41–32, 38–71, 54–31)

Final: Ruth Harrison 7–6 Joyce Gardner (73–38, 30–39, 49–58, 23–57, 43–51, 31–62, 65–11, 37–59, 66–20, 80–23, 63–32, 51–43, 51–33)

Harrison won the last five frames, after being four frames down at 2–6, to win the title.

1935 Championship
Source: The Times,  Gloucester Citizen.

There were three entrants.

Semi-finals
Ruth Harrison 5 – 1 Thelma Carpenter (70–34, 30–37, 77–30, 85–46, 59–35, 77–46)
Joyce Gardner bye.

Final: Ruth Harrison 7–5 Joyce Gardner

1936 Championship
Source: The Billiard Player, June 1936. There were four entrants.

Semi-finals
Ruth Harrison 5 – 1 Eva Collins (50–37, 52–37, 28–63, 76–21, 59–28, 50–37)
Thelma Carpenter 5 -1 Joyce Gardner (49–35, 60–46, 48–47, 60–19, 26–56, 50–42)

Final: Ruth Harrison 7 -3 Thelma Carpenter (58–48, 41–71, 55–48, 48–40, 61–29, 67–44, 43–60, 66–56, 54–51, 16–71)

1937 championship
Source: Billiards and Snooker, June 1937. There were four entrants.

Semi-finals
Joyce Gardner 5–4 Margaret Lennan (66–44, 55–45, 29–61, 58–52, 49–39, 47–45, 35–50, 19–54, 33–46)
Ruth Harrison 8–1 Thelma Carpenter (60–39, 63–37, 54–42, 70–33, 46–51, 57–27, 76–37, 63–36, 54–28)

Final: Ruth Harrison 9–4 Joyce Gardner (84–20, 68–22, 11–64, 70–51, 48–36, 69–22, 54–62, 78–32, 61–60, 58–50, 37–54, 22–48, 76–43)

1938 championship
Sources: Western Daily Press, Birmingham Daily Gazette, Daily Herald.

There were five entrants.

Heat 1
Thelma Carpenter 3–2 Joyce Gardner 
Ruth Harrison, Margaret Lennan and Barbara Meston received byes.

Semi-finals
Ruth Harrison 6–3 Margaret Lennan
Thelma Carpenter 6–3 Barbara Meston

Final: Ruth Harrison 11–2 Thelma Carpenter

1939 championship
Source: The Billiard Player, May 1939. There were five entrants, but Joyce Gardener withdrew due to influenza.

Heat 1: G.I. Rowley 3–2 Barbara Meston (52–38, 57–28, 46–47, 16–34, 52–41)

Semi-finals
Thelma Carpenter w.o. Joyce Gardner 
Ruth Harrison 9–0 G.I. Rowley (60–35, 59–30, 69–2, 63–17, 67–3, 58–33, 56–25, 44–10, 63–33)

Final: Ruth Harrison 8–5 Thelma Carpenter (70–50, 65–44, 57–46, 62–58, 45–44, 26–69, 55–39, 42–52, 52–29, 60–39, 24–57, 42–59, 34–81)

1940 championship
Sources: Western Mail, Birmingham Daily Gazette, The People.

There were five entrants. Joyce Gardner withdrew because her husband was ill.

Heat 1: Agnes Davies 3–2 Margaret Lennan (37–42, 33–43, 61–16, 65–15, 53–50)

Semi-finals
Agnes Davies w.o. Joyce Gardner
Ruth Harrison 8–1 Barbara Meston (57–39, 42–28, 73–22, 51–30, 76–10, 66–35, 76–16, 45–58, 53–37)

Final: Ruth Harrison 11–2 Agnes Davies 

After the first day of the final, Harrison led 6–2 and needed only one frame to win. She won the ninth frame 54–38 to take the match. Four further frames were played, which Harrison won 67–13, 72–40, 71–34 and 50–37.

1948 Championship
Source: The Billiard Player, May 1948 and June 1948.

There were four entrants.

Heats:
Agnes Morris 16–5 Joyce Gardner. 
Thelma Carpenter 16–5 Barbara Meston

Playoff: Agnes Morris 11–10 Thelma Carpenter

Final: Ruth Harrison 16-14 Agnes Morris

(Cumulative frames won after each session, Harrison first: 3–2, 7–3, 9–6, 13–7, 15–10, 16–14.) Morris won the last four frames, after the result of the match had been decided.

1949 Championship
Source: The Billiard Player, July 1949. There were three entrants.

Semi-final: Thelma Carpenter 20–11 Joyce Gardner. Carpenter won nine consecutive frames (from the 8th to the 16th) and at one point was leading 15–5. The highest break of the match was 37 by Carpenter.

Final: Agnes Morris 16–15 Thelma Carpenter(Match progress in frames won after each session: 1–4, 5–5, 6–9, 10–10, 11–14, 15–15, 16–15.) The highest break of the match was 33 by Morris, in the final frame.

1950 Championship
Source: The Billiard Player, June 1950 and July 1950. There were only two entrants.

Final: Thelma Carpenter 20–10 Agnes Morris

The score at the winning frame was 16–7.

References 

Recurring sporting events established in 1934
1934 establishments in England
World championships in snooker
Snooker